The Desamparados station is a railway station in Lima, Peru. It is situated on the left margin of the Rímac River, next to the Government Palace. The station was named after the church of Nuestra Señora de los Desamparados. The project began in 1890 by the Peruvian Corporation and three years later the Lima–La Oroya route was inaugurated. The line became known as the Ferrocarril Central Andino

At present the station only has administrative use, although it can offer passenger excursion services between Lima and the central mountain range. It serves mainly as an exhibition hall, exhibiting such items as the presidential wagon "Paquita", named in honor of the wife of the then President of the Republic Oscar R. Benavides.

Architecture 

The three-story building of the station was the first public work conducted by the Peruvian architect Rafael Marquina in 1911, and its construction was finished a year later. In the process of its construction modern materials and techniques were used such as reinforced concrete and expanded metal. One of the main features to the interior is the stained glass skylight, made in the Art Nouveau style. The main facade is symmetrical and consists of five vertical bodies divided by four pilasters of classical design. The facade is designed in Beaux-Arts architecture style.

In episode 8 "Comfort Food" of US TV series Pushing Daisies (second season), a photograph of the front of the Desamparados station is used as the Papen County Convention Center where the piemaker is competing in the comfort food cook-off.

The House of Peruvian Literature 

The House of Peruvian Literature was inaugurated in Desamparados station by President Alan García on 20 October 2009. Architect Juan Carlos Burga was commissioned to design the museographic work. The architect David Mutal was in charge of maintaining the validity and sobriety of the station's architecture.

Among the pieces on display is the presidential wagon "Paquita", ordered to be built in honor of the wife of then-President Óscar R. Benavides.

Citations

References

External links 
 The House of Peruvian Literature 

Buildings and structures in Lima
Railway stations in Peru
Railway stations opened in 1912
Beaux-Arts architecture
Neoclassical architecture in Peru
Art Nouveau architecture in Peru
Art Nouveau railway stations
1912 establishments in Peru